Lentibacillus lacisalsi is a spore-forming, aerobic and moderately halophilic bacterium from the genus of Lentibacillus which has been isolated from a salt lake in China.

References

Bacillaceae
Bacteria described in 2005